FC Flora Tallinn, commonly known as Flora Tallinn, or simply as Flora, is a football club, based in Tallinn, Estonia, that competes in the Naiste Meistriliiga.

Established in 1997 as the women's football division of Flora, the team has won 4 Naiste Meistriliiga, 8 Estonian Women's Cups and 6 Estonian Women's Supercups.

History
Founded in March 1997 as Flora ladies team, Flora Naiskond played their first league game in the following month against the defending champions Pärnu, losing 0–3. Despite this, the team went on to enjoy some early success as Flora finished third in the 1998 season. Flora managed to repeat this feat in the next two seasons in 1999 and 2000.

The following seasons were more disappointing as Flora finished 4th in 2001 and 2002 and 5th in 2003. Problems deepened during the winter of 2003 and Flora had to start the 2004 season without a manager before Anders Süvari, who had coached the team before, returned in summer. Despite this the team managed to win their first 4 league games. Revitalized, Flora once again challenged the top 3 but missed out narrowly, losing 2–3 in the penultimate round and leaving the team just two points away from the bronze medals. Late in the season, Süvari was replaced by Allan Soomets who remained as coach until the 2012 season. Since December 2012 the team has been coached by Richard Barnwell.

Flora finished the league third in the 2007 and 2008 season but eventually became champions for the first time in 2018. They have also been successful in the Estonian Women's Cup, winning the competition in 2013 by defeating league rivals Pärnu 2–0 in the finals. On 1 December 2015, Aleksandra Ševoldajeva was appointed as manager.

Honours
 Naiste Meistriliiga
 Winners (5): 2018, 2019, 2020, 2021, 2022
 Estonian Women's Cup
 Winners (8): 2007, 2008, 2013, 2018, 2019, 2020, 2021, 2022
 Estonian Women's Supercup
 Winners (6): 2009, 2010, 2018, 2019, 2020, 2022

Players

Current squad
 As of 19 August 2021

Management

Current technical staff

References

External links
 Official website 
 Team page at Estonian Football Association

Women's football clubs in Estonia
Women
Association football clubs established in 1997
Football clubs in Tallinn
1997 establishments in Estonia